Richard May (c. 1638 – 1713), of the Middle Temple and Grey Friars, Chichester, Sussex, was an English politician.

He was a Member (MP) of the Parliament of England for Chichester on 6 November 1673, March 1679 and 1685.

References

1630s births
1713 deaths
English MPs 1661–1679
English MPs 1679
People from Chichester
English MPs 1685–1687